Jonathan Pim may refer to:

Jonathan Pim (1806–1885), Irish philanthropist and Liberal politician, MP for Dublin
Jonathan Pim (1858–1949), Irish lawyer and Liberal politician, Solicitor-General and Attorney-General for Ireland